The Jaguar R2 was the car with which the Jaguar team competed in the  Formula One season.  It was driven by Eddie Irvine, who was in his second year with the team, and Luciano Burti, who had deputised for Irvine at the 2000 Austrian Grand Prix.  However, the Brazilian was replaced by Pedro de la Rosa after only four Grands Prix.

For Jaguar, 2001 was a season of consolidation after a disastrous début season in  saw the team score only four points in the Constructors' Championship.  The car was therefore more conservative and reliable than in the previous year, and the team's success was slightly greater, if not a quantum leap forward.  Indeed, there were only four points finishes from Irvine and de la Rosa throughout the season, although one of these was Jaguar's maiden podium finish at Monaco.

The season was more notable for Jaguar's exploits off the track.  McLaren designer Adrian Newey seemingly signed a contract with the team, but quickly changed his mind and remained with his current employers.  The deal was struck by Team Principal Bobby Rahal, and its failure, allied to an alleged deal to sell Irvine to Jordan, would culminate in his replacement by fellow retired racer Niki Lauda by season's end.  It was seen that such a replacement was inevitable, as Lauda had initially arrived in the team whilst Rahal was in charge.

The team eventually finished eighth in the Constructors' Championship, with nine points. The R2 was succeeded by the Jaguar R3. It was the last F1 car to ever run on Texaco fuel.

As of 2022, a Jaguar R2 runs in the BOSS GP Championship driven by French driver Didier Sirgue.

Complete Formula One results
(key)

References

External links

Jaguar Formula One cars
2001 Formula One season cars